Mesanthemum is a genus of plants in the Eriocaulaceae, first described in 1856. It is native to tropical Africa and Madagascar.

Mesanthemum africanum Moldenke - Mozambique, Zimbabwe
Mesanthemum albidum Lecomte - Guinea, Senegal, Sierra Leone
Mesanthemum angustitepalum Kimp - Zaïre
Mesanthemum auratum Lecomte - Guinea, Senegal, Sierra Leone, Guinea-Bissau
Mesanthemum bennae Jacq.-Fél - Guinea
Mesanthemum cupricola Kimp - Zaïre
Mesanthemum glabrum Kimp - Zaïre, Angola, Zambia
Mesanthemum jaegeri Jacq.-Fél - Ivory Coast, Sierra Leone, Nigeria, Cameroon, Congo-Brazzaville
Mesanthemum pilosum Kimp - Zaïre, Angola, Zambia, Malawi
Mesanthemum prescottianum (Bong.) Körn. - Guinea, Ivory Coast, Liberia, Sierra Leone, Gabon 
Mesanthemum pubescens (Lam.) Körn. - Madagascar
Mesanthemum radicans (Benth.) Körn. - widespread from Liberia east to Tanzania, south to Mozambique
Mesanthemum reductum H.E.Hess - Congo-Brazzaville, Angola
Mesanthemum rutenbergianum Körn. - Madagascar
Mesanthemum variabile Kimp - Zaïre, Zambia

References

Eriocaulaceae
Taxa named by Friedrich August Körnicke